Thomas William Wield (1886–1963) was an English professional footballer who made 131 appearances in the Football League playing for Lincoln City. He played as a wing half.

Life and career
Wield was born in Lincoln, Lincolnshire, and began his football career with St Catherines before joining his local professional club, Lincoln City. He made his debut in a 1–0 win away to Burslem Port Vale in the Football League Second Division in October 1904, and played 13 league games before spending a couple of seasons back in local football with Grantham Avenue. He returned to Lincoln City in 1909, and remained with the club for the next ten years, playing his last game for the club in the War League in 1919.

After the war, he played for Scunthorpe & Lindsey United and Gainsborough Trinity, made one Central Alliance appearance for Grantham in September 1922, and finished his career with Horncastle Town and then Lincoln Claytons.

Wield died in Lincoln in 1963.

Notes

References

1886 births
1963 deaths
Sportspeople from Lincoln, England
English footballers
Association football wing halves
Lincoln City F.C. players
Grantham Avenue F.C. players
Scunthorpe United F.C. players
Gainsborough Trinity F.C. players
Grantham Town F.C. players
Horncastle Town F.C. players
English Football League players